Frederic Lamond may refer to:
Frederic Lamond (pianist) (1868–1948), Scottish pianist and composer
Frederic Lamond (Wiccan) (1931–2020), Wiccan writer and member of the Bricket Wood coven